Mahalaya (2019) is an Indian Bengali language drama film directed by Soumik Sen and produced by Nideas Creations and Productions Pvt Ltd. The film narrates an incident in Bengal in 1976, when Birendra Krishna Bhadra narrated and Pankaj Mullick composed widely popular Mahisasuramardini program, which has been playing on All India Radio since 1931 on the eve of Mahalaya, was replaced by a new program Durga Durgatiharini, narrated by Bengali film actor Uttam Kumar and composed by Hemanta Mukherjee. Subhasish Mukhopadhyay played the role of Bhadra and Jisshu Sengupta played the role of Uttam Kumar.

The film was released theatrically on 1 March 2019.

Cast 
 Subhasish Mukherjee as Birendra Krishna Bhadra
 Jisshu Sengupta as Uttam Kumar
 Saptarshi Ray as Hemanta Mukhopadhyay
 Prosenjit Chatterjee as Shashi Sinha, Former I & B Secretary of India.
 Subhomoy Chatterjee as Pankaj Mullick
 Kanchan Mullick as Paritosh Banerjee, Indian Administrative Service Officer, Former Joint Secretary to the Government of India and husband of Shakuntala Devi
 Jayant Kripalani as Harold Stevenson, former Director-general, Akashbani, Kolkata
 Bhaswar Chatterjee as Anil Bagchi
 Sudipa Basu as Ramarani Devi, wife of Birendra Krishna Bhadra
 Devlina Kumar as daughter of Pankaj Mullick

Release
The official trailer of the film was released by Nideas Creations & Productions on 9 February 2019.

The film was released theatrically on 1 March 2019.

References

External links 
 

2019 films
Indian drama films
Films directed by Soumik Sen
Bengali-language Indian films
2010s Bengali-language films